The German Hospital, Dalston, was a hospital in Dalston, East London.

History
The hospital was established in 1845 to offer free treatment to London’s then large German-speaking community which had a significant presence in the East End.

 
The hospital’s German speaking staff remained on site during the First World War, but were interned during the Second World War with their places taken by British staff. It joined the National Health Service in 1948 and became a psychiatric hospital in 1974. The hospital, popularly known as ‘The German’, closed in 1987 and patients were transferred to Homerton Hospital. Some of its buildings are now used for affordable housing. Parts of the buildings are grade II listed.

References

Further reading 
 McKellar, Elizabeth (1991),  The German Hospital Hackney. A Social and Architectural History 1847–1987. London.
 Specht, Maureen (2nd edition 1997),  The German Hospital in London and the Community it served 1845 to 1948. Anglo-German Family History Society Publications.
 Swinbank, Christiane (2007) Medicine, Philanthropy and Religion. Selective Intercultural Transfers at the German Hospital in London, 1845–1914. In: Stefan Manz, Margit Schulte Beerbühl, John R. Davis (Ed.): Migration and Transfer from Germany to Britain 1660–1914 (Prince Albert Research Publications 3). Munich, pp. 119–130. 
 Waddington, Keir (2000) Charity and the London Hospitals, 1850–1898 (= Studies in History. New Series). Woodbridge.

External links 
 

Defunct hospitals in London
Grade II listed hospital buildings
Grade II listed buildings in the London Borough of Hackney
Dalston
Health in the London Borough of Hackney